Amy Lyons is an Australian media personality and influencer active in China, where she is known as a "wǎng hóng" (网红), which in China means people who are famous on social media.

She originated from the city of Sydney, and is an alumna of the secondary school Pymble Ladies' College. She stated that her interest in China began with a history class she took in her final year there in 2011, as the teacher was highly interested in the country. As an international commerce student at the University of New South Wales, she began taking Mandarin Chinese courses in 2012, in 2014 she took a student exchange period in Shanghai, of seven months, at Fudan University. Around 2014 she began working at a bank in Australia, but disliked it, and she also served as a cheerleader in the Manly Seabirds, the cheerleading team of the Manly Warringah Sea Eagles. In 2015 she entered into the "Chinese Bridge" Chinese language competition and qualified to be the Australian representative. She received about 1,000 followers on Sina Weibo after the Chinese Bridge producers suggested she do so. A Chinese friend gave her a Chinese name, which Lyons said was chosen to reflect her personality.

In February 2017 she moved to Beijing to take Chinese courses at Tsinghua University, and she began learning shaolin kung fu. She stated that she decided to extend her social media activities after arriving in Beijing. In 2017, on her Chinese social media platforms she had a total of 65,000 followers.  her most prominent social media platform was Miaopai. That year she had 1,100 followers on Instagram. She received increased social media coverage in a video called "Chopstick Legs". Lyons stated that Chinese people are attracted to having long, thin legs.  it had over three million views, making it her video with the most views.

See also
 Wanghong economy
 Australians in China
 Afu Thomas (Thomas Derksen) - German internet celebrity active in China
 Dashan - Canadian television personality in China
 Lee and Oli Barrett - British social media personalities in China
 David Gulasi - Australian internet celebrity active in China
 Raz Galor - Israeli social media figure in China
 Winston Sterzel - South African social media figure in China

References

External links
 Amy Lyons Profile - Chinese Bridge 
  
 
 
Social media influencers
Australian expatriates in China
Australian Internet celebrities
Living people
People from Sydney
University of New South Wales alumni
Year of birth missing (living people)